Sesung is a village in Kweneng District of Botswana, located 85 km north-west of Molepolole. The population was 1,281 in the 2001 census.

References

Kweneng District
Villages in Botswana